Louis Vignaud (14 June 1929 – 10 July 2014) was a French sports shooter. He competed in the 50 metre pistol event at the 1968 Summer Olympics.

References

1929 births
2014 deaths
French male sport shooters
Olympic shooters of France
Shooters at the 1968 Summer Olympics
Sportspeople from Angers